Jörg Drehmel (born 3 May 1945) is a retired East German triple jumper who won a silver medal at the 1972 Olympics. He was the European champion in 1971.

Sports career 
Drehmel first tried his hand at the javelin throw and the decathlon before switching to the triple jump in 1966. His first big success came with a win at the European Cup in 1970, where he was the first German jumper to set a record with the first-ever jump over 17 meters. His jump of 17.16 meters to win the European Championship in 1971 did not qualify as a record due to excessive tail wind.

Background 
Drehmel had a degree in electronics and was an officer in the National People's Army. At the end of his career in 1977 he became a youth coach for long and triple jump athletes. At the demise of the GDR he lost this position, and later joined the state sports association in the state of Brandenburg. At present he is the honorary jumping coach at SC Potsdam. He resides in Stahnsdorf near Potsdam.

References

External links
 
 
 
 
 

1945 births
Living people
People from Vorpommern-Greifswald
East German male triple jumpers
Sportspeople from Mecklenburg-Western Pomerania
Olympic athletes of East Germany
Athletes (track and field) at the 1972 Summer Olympics
Olympic silver medalists for East Germany
European Athletics Championships medalists
Medalists at the 1972 Summer Olympics
Olympic silver medalists in athletics (track and field)
Universiade medalists in athletics (track and field)
Recipients of the Patriotic Order of Merit in bronze
Universiade bronze medalists for East Germany
Medalists at the 1970 Summer Universiade
Medalists at the 1973 Summer Universiade